Anita McLaren (née Punt'; born 2 October 1987) is a New Zealand field hockey player. She competed for the New Zealand women's national field hockey team (the Black Sticks Women'') from 2009 to 2018, including for the team at the 2010 Commonwealth Games and the 2012 Summer Olympics.

Career
Born in Nelson to Nicolaas and Adele McLaren, Anita Punt is of Dutch descent through her father and holds dual New Zealand and Dutch citizenship. She attended Waimea College in nearby Richmond, before moving to Wellington at age 18 to focus on her hockey with the Capital National Hockey League team. McLaren was first selected for the Black Sticks Women in June 2009, along with ten other players as the Black Sticks squad was overhauled following its last place finish at the 2008 Beijing Olympics. She played her first match for New Zealand on 19 June 2009 against India in hometown Nelson.  She helped New Zealand win a bronze medal at the 2014 Commonwealth Games, scoring the first goal in the bronze medal match.

McLaren has a reputation for her speed, being touted as one of the fastest female hockey players in the world with a time over ten metres ranking her within the top eight of the Black Sticks Men's squad. In February 2013, McLaren was entered as a wildcard entry into the annual International Track Meet in Christchurch, in which she won the 100 metres in 12.61 seconds (on a grass track and with a strong 2.9 m/s headwind), beating many seasoned New Zealand track athletes. She later won the 100 metres and 200 metres at the Porritt Classic in Hamilton,  before competing in the New Zealand Track and Field Championships in March 2013 in Auckland. However, McLaren was off pace and came fifth in the 100 metres, with a time of 12.23 seconds (wind +0.1 m/s).

, McLaren resided on the North Shore of Auckland. She is a retail assistant by trade, but is currently studying veterinary nursing.
She married decathlete Scott McLaren in March 2016.

McLaren announced her retirement from international hockey in October 2018. She subsequently headed the sport department at King's College in Auckland.

References

External links
 

1987 births
Living people
New Zealand female field hockey players
New Zealand people of Dutch descent
Sportspeople from Nelson, New Zealand
People educated at Waimea College
Olympic field hockey players of New Zealand
Field hockey players at the 2010 Commonwealth Games
Field hockey players at the 2012 Summer Olympics
Field hockey players at the 2014 Commonwealth Games
Commonwealth Games silver medallists for New Zealand
Commonwealth Games bronze medallists for New Zealand
Field hockey players at the 2016 Summer Olympics
Commonwealth Games medallists in field hockey
Field hockey players at the 2018 Commonwealth Games
Commonwealth Games gold medallists for New Zealand
Female field hockey midfielders
20th-century New Zealand women
21st-century New Zealand women
Medallists at the 2010 Commonwealth Games
Medallists at the 2014 Commonwealth Games